Pea Ridge is community in Santa Rosa County, Florida, United States, located along U.S. Highway 90, east of Pace. It was designated a Census-designated place (CDP) by the Census Bureau after the 2010 census.

Notes 

Pensacola metropolitan area
Census-designated places in Santa Rosa County, Florida